Pyatt is a town in western Marion County, Arkansas, United States. The population was 181 at the 2020 census, down from 221 in 2010.

Geography
Pyatt is located in western Marion County at  (36.252414, -92.843681), in the valley of Crooked Creek, an east-flowing tributary of the White River.

U.S. Routes 412 and 62 pass through the southern part of the town, leading east  to Yellville, the county seat, and west  to Harrison.

List of highways 
 US 62/US 412
 U.S. Route 62 Spur
 Highway 125

Demographics

As of the census of 2000, there were 253 people, 97 households, and 62 families residing in the town. The population density was 198.3 inhabitants per square mile (76.3/km). The racial makeup of the town was 98.81% White, 0.40% Black or African American, 0.40% Native American and 0.40% Pacific Islander.  0.40% of the population were Hispanic or Latino of any race.

There were 97 households, out of which 40.2% had children under the age of 18 living with them, 55.7% were married couples living together, 4.1% had a female householder with no husband present, and 35.1% were non-families. 34.0% of all households were made up of individuals, and 18.6% had someone living alone who was 65 years of age or older.  The average household size was 2.61 and the average family size was 3.35.

In the town, the population was spread out, with 33.2% under the age of 18, 7.9% from 18 to 24, 28.9% from 25 to 44, 17.0% from 45 to 64, and 13.0% who were 65 years of age or older.  The median age was 30 years. For every 100 females, there were 97.7 males.  For every 100 females age 18 and over, there were 103.6 males.

The median income for a household in the town was $19,583, and the median income for a family was $26,250. Males had a median income of $22,321 versus $18,214 for females. The per capita income for the town was $8,633.  About 10.5% of families and 16.7% of the population were below the poverty line, including 12.9% of those under the age of 18 and 20.7% of those 65 or over.

Education 
Public education is available from the Ozark Mountain School District that includes Bruno–Pyatt High School.

On July 1, 2004, the former Bruno-Pyatt School District consolidated into the Ozark Mountain School District.

References

External links
Pyatt website

Towns in Arkansas
Towns in Marion County, Arkansas